Egon Mayer (19 August 1917 – 2 March 1944) was a Luftwaffe wing commander and fighter ace of Nazi Germany during World War II. He was credited with 102 enemy aircraft shot down in over 353 combat missions. His victories were all claimed over the Western Front and included 26 four-engine bombers, 51 Supermarine Spitfires and 12 P-47 Thunderbolts. Mayer was the first fighter pilot to score 100 victories entirely on the Western Front.

Born in Konstanz, Mayer, volunteered for military service in the Luftwaffe of Nazi Germany in 1937. Following flight training he was posted to Jagdgeschwader 2 "Richthofen" (JG 2—2nd Fighter Wing) in 1939. He fought in the Battle of France and claimed his first aerial victory in that campaign on 13 June 1940. Mayer was appointed squadron leader of the 7. Staffel (7th squadron) of JG 2 in June 1941. Two months later, following his 21st aerial victory, he received the Knight's Cross of the Iron Cross on 1 August 1941. He claimed 16 further victories and was awarded the German Cross in Gold on 16 July 1942. In November 1942, Mayer was appointed commander of the III. Gruppe (3rd group) of JG 2.

Mayer claimed his first victories over United States Army Air Forces (USAAF) four-engine bombers when he shot down two B-17 Flying Fortresses and a B-24 Liberator on 23 November 1942. Together with fellow fighter ace Georg-Peter Eder, Mayer developed the head-on attack as the most effective tactic against the Allied daylight heavy combat box bomber formations. He received the Knight's Cross of the Iron Cross with Oak Leaves on 16 April 1943 after 63 victories. On 1 July 1943, he replaced Walter Oesau as commander of JG 2. He claimed his 90th victory on 31 December 1943 and on 5 February 1944 became the first pilot on the Channel Front to reach 100 victories. Mayer was killed in action on 2 March 1944 while leading an attack on a USAAF bomber formation; he was shot down by P-47 Thunderbolt escort fighters near Montmédy, France. He was posthumously awarded the Knight's Cross of the Iron Cross with Oak Leaves and Swords.

Early life and career

Mayer, the son of a farmer, was born on 19 August 1917 in Konstanz at the Bodensee. Konstanz at the time was in the Grand Duchy of Baden of the German Empire. Mayer grew up on his parents' farm named Hauserhof and spent his spare time at the glider airfield at the Bellenberg near Engen. He went to school at the Langemarck-Realgymnasium—a secondary school built on the mid-level Realschule to achieve the Abitur (university entry qualification)—in Singen. Today, the Langemarck-Realgymnasium, which had been named after the location of the World War I Battle of Langemarck, is the Hegau-Gymnasium.

Following his graduation, Mayer volunteered for military service in the Luftwaffe on 1 November 1937. His military training began at the 2nd Air Warfare School (Luftkriegsschule 2) at Gatow, on the southwestern outskirts of Berlin. He was then trained as a fighter pilot and promoted to Leutnant (second lieutenant) on 1 August 1939. His classmates at Gatow included Gerhard Barkhorn and Julius Meimberg. Mayer was selected for specialized fighter pilot training and was posted to the Jagdfliegerschule Schleißheim, the fighter pilot school in Schleißheim.

World War II
World War II in Europe began on Friday, 1 September 1939, when German forces invaded Poland, the day Mayer was on route to Schleißheim. Mayer received the Iron Cross 2nd Class on 25 October 1939 and was transferred to Jagdgeschwader 2 "Richthofen" (JG 2—2nd Fighter Wing), named after World War I fighter ace Manfred von Richthofen, on 6 December 1939. For his entire combat career, with the exception of a brief posting to the fighter pilot school at Werneuchen, Mayer served in JG 2 "Richthofen". He claimed his first aerial victory on 13 June 1940 during the Battle of France, shooting down a Morane-Saulnier M.S.406 belonging to the French Air Force (Armée de l'Air).

In the Battle of Britain, Mayer often flew over the English Channel as the wingman of Helmut Wick. He claimed three further victories in this campaign, all over Royal Air Force (RAF) Supermarine Spitfires, but was himself shot down or forced to land at the French coast. Once he had to swim in the Channel for an hour before he was rescued. At the end of 1940 Mayer had four victories to his credit and JG 2 "Richthofen" was withdrawn from combat to replenish the heavy losses it had sustained. Following a short tour as fighter pilot instructor at the Jagdfliegerschule (fighter pilot school) in Werneuchen, Mayer was sent back to the Channel Front.

On 10 June 1941, Oberleutnant (First Lieutenant) Mayer was appointed Staffelkapitän (squadron leader) of 7. Staffel (7th squadron) of JG 2 "Richthofen", based at Saint-Pol-Brias. He claimed his 19th and 20th victory on 23 July 1941 and was awarded the Knight's Cross of the Iron Cross on 1 August 1941 after his 21st aerial victory. He received the award with fellow JG 2 "Richthofen" pilots Oberleutnant Erich Leie and Oberleutnant Rudolf Pflanz on that day. The triple award presentation was recorded by the Deutsche Wochenschau (German Weekly Review),  a newsreel series released in the cinemas. His score had increased to 28 aerial victories by the end of 1941. 

On 12 February 1942 Mayer claimed a Westland Whirlwind during Operation Donnerkeil, the air cover plan for the Channel Dash of German warships from port in western France to Germany Four of these uncommon aircraft were lost from No. 137 Squadron with their pilots. On 25 April 1942, Mayer claimed four RAF fighters. Fighter Command suffered high losses on this date; 15 of them have been attributed to JG 2 and JG 26. No. 118 Squadron lost two pilot killed in action with JG 2, and another five from No. 501 Squadron were shot down in the Cherbourg area leading to the death of four members. Mayer received the German Cross in Gold on 16 July 1942. Mayer claimed a Spitfire off Selsey Bill on 31 July. Flying Officer T Kratka, No. 317 Squadron, was wounded in the legs and parachuted to safety south of the land mark. On 19 August, his 25th birthday, Mayer shot down two Spitfires over Dieppe during the British/Canadian raid on Dieppe (Operation Jubilee), his 49th and 50th victory. 50 of RAF Fighter Command's losses were attributed to action with German fighters along with another 12 damaged. The Luftwaffe's losses were much smaller, but JG 2 and JG 26 had been worn down through losses and damaged aircraft and could not make much of an impression during the afternoon. Mayer was among the German pilots to file their claims in the later afternoon.

Group commander

Mayer was promoted to Hauptmann (captain) and was appointed Gruppenkommandeur (group commander) of III. Gruppe of JG 2 "Richthofen" in November 1942. On 23 November, Mayer claimed his first victories over United States Army Air Forces (USAAF) four-engined bombers, when he shot down two B-17 Flying Fortresses and a B-24 Liberator. Together with Georg-Peter Eder, Mayer developed the head-on attack as the most effective tactic against the Allied daylight heavy combat box bomber formations. The concept was based on a Kette (chain), three aircraft flying in a "V" formation, attacking from ahead and to the left. When in range, the attackers opened fire with a deflection burst, aiming in front of the enemy aircraft. Following the attack, the pilots would pull up sharply to the left or right. This gave the attacking fighters the best chance of avoiding the massed firepower of the bombers' guns.

On 14 February 1943, Mayer claimed three RAF Hawker Typhoons, claiming his 60th to 62nd victories. Following his 63rd victory he was awarded the Knight's Cross of the Iron Cross with Oak Leaves on 16 April 1943, the 232nd officer or soldier of the Wehrmacht so honored. The presentation was made by Adolf Hitler in his office at the Reich Chancellery in Berlin on 11 May 1943. Mayer was then promoted to Major (major) on 1 June 1943. Fighter Command lost no aircraft on 14 February 1943. The previous day, it did report two Typhoons lost in combat with Fw 190s from JG 2—both pilots from No. 609 Squadron were killed.

In June 1943, Mayer encountered Robert S. Johnson, a future ace from the 56th Fighter Group of the US Eighth Air Force. Johnson's Republic P-47D Thunderbolt had been badly shot-up by some Focke-Wulf Fw 190s during a routine mission. As Johnson limped home, with a canopy that would not open and hydraulic fluid and oil covering his windscreen, Mayer pulled alongside him in his Fw 190. Mayer looked the wounded P-47 over, and then circled to come in from Johnson's six-o'clock to give it the coup de grâce. The first gun pass failed to knock the heavy American fighter out of the sky. Mayer made two more runs on Johnson, without success. After running out of ammunition, Mayer pulled alongside Johnson, saluted him and headed for home. Johnson landed his plane, and counted more than 200 holes, without even moving around the airplane. He also saw that a 20 mm cannon shell had exploded just behind his headrest, which had made it impossible to open his canopy. Other authors have expressed doubt about Mayer's alleged encounter with Johnson. There is no direct evidence Mayer was involved in this battle. No III./JG 2 pilot is present on victory or loss records according to the most complete German sources.

On 22 June 1943, a flight led by Mayer encountered an RAF Spitfire unit. During the course of the engagement, he claimed one Spitfire shot down and damage to another. He purportedly shot down three USAAF P-47s on 26 June 1943, though no claims can be found for Mayer in German records. Fighter Command lost five fighters on 22 June. Four were lost in action with Jagdgeschwader 1 (JG 1—1st Fighter Wing). The only unattributed loss came when Flying Officer J Watlington, No. 400 Squadron was shot down and captured. He was later repatriated in 1944.

Wing commander and death
Mayer was appointed Geschwaderkommodore (wing commander) of JG 2 "Richthofen" on 1 July 1943, thus succeeding Oberst (Colonel) Walter Oesau. Command of III. Gruppe was passed on to the Staffelkapitän of 8. Staffel, Hauptmann Bruno Stolle. Mayer accounted for a B-17 on 14 July. The 305th Bombardment Group formed part of an attack on the Paris area. Mayer led his wing into combat, but held position over Evreux, to stay clear of Allied fighter escorts and to await the bomber stream. The 305th bombed the target unscathed but were then attacked by two Fw 190s; one of the pilots being Mayer. Navigator Ed Burford gave a description of the attack:

Whoever it was gave a riveting display of aerobatics out in front of our entire 102nd Combat Wing before slashing in to fatally damage the leading ship of the 422nd Bombardment Squadron in the low slot. The attack took place at 08:18 near Etampes, southwest of Paris. After fires broke out between the #2 and the fuselage, and between the #3 and #4 engines, the ship nosed down in a spin - somehow seven men managed to hit the silk. I had never seen such a tremendous volume of tracer go after that one plane with a wingman in tow. Downright discouraging to hit nothing but air.

Mayer was not known for showboating, and his actions were probably a result of radio failure - an attempt to attract the attention of his pilots after finding the unescorted bombers. The claim matches exactly the time and place of the 305th Bomb Group's loss. The bomber was B-17F-1-35-DL, 42-3190, of the 322nd Bombardment Squadron.

Mayer claimed two Spitfires on 22 August. JG 2 claimed six between 19:50 and 20:15. No. 66 Squadron lost one pilot killed while another evaded. No. 485 Squadron lost four; one pilot was killed, two captured and one evaded capture to return to Britain. He claimed three B-17s shot down within 19 minutes on 6 September. The Eighth Air Force was targeting Stuttgart that day and lost 45 aircraft. Mayer accounted for two Spitfires on 22 September near Evreux. Two No. 308 Polish Fighter Squadron pilots were shot down in the area; one was killed the other escaped capture. On 1 December 1943, Mayer shot down three P-47 Thunderbolts. His claimed aerial victories increased to 90 on 30 December 1943. Mayer was credited with four victories on 7 January 1944, three B-24s and one B-17 shot down in the vicinity of Orléans. On 4 February 1944 he claimed a P-47 from the US 56th Fighter Group, the only American fighter lost by the 8th Fighter Command on this date. It was 100th victory, and he became the first fighter pilot on the Channel Front to achieve this mark.

Mayer's final score stood at 102 when he was shot down and killed in action by a P-47 Thunderbolt near Montmédy on 2 March 1944. Flying Focke-Wulf Fw 190 A-6 (Werknummer 470468—factory number), Mayer had led his Stabsschwarm (headquarters unit) and elements of III. It made a violent snap roll and went into a vertical dive, crashing within  of Montmédy. He was posthumously decorated with the Knight's Cross of the Iron Cross with Oak Leaves and Swords that day. On 10 March, command of JG 2 was passed to Major Kurt Ubben.

Recent research by historian Norman Fortier suggests that Mayer was shot down by Lieutenant Walter Gresham of the 358th Fighter Squadron of the 355th Fighter Wing. The claim is based on gun camera footage and recollections of Mayer's wingman, who was forced to bail out during the action. Mayer was buried at the cemetery of Beaumont-le-Roger, France, and in 1955 re-interred at Saint-Désir-de-Lisieux German war cemetery near Lisieux, Normandy, France.

Summary of career

Aerial victory claims
According to US historian David T. Zabecki, Mayer was credited with 102 aerial victories. Mathews and Foreman, authors of Luftwaffe Aces — Biographies and Victory Claims, researched the German Federal Archives and found records for 102 aerial victory claims, plus five further unconfirmed claims. All of his victories were claimed on the Western Front and include 27 four-engined bombers.

Victory claims were logged to a map-reference (PQ = Planquadrat), for example "PQ 14 West 3853". These sectors were then subdivided into 36 smaller units to give a location area 3 × 4 km in size.

Awards
 Wound Badge in Silver
 Front Flying Clasp of the Luftwaffe for Fighter Pilots in Gold with Pennant "300"
 Combined Pilots-Observation Badge
 Iron Cross (1939)
 2nd Class (25 October 1939)
 1st Class (May 1940)
 German Cross in Gold on 16 July 1942 as Oberleutnant in the 7./Jagdgeschwader 2 "Richthofen"
 Knight's Cross of the Iron Cross with Oak Leaves and Swords
 Knight's Cross on 1 August 1941 as Leutnant of the Reserves and pilot in Jagdgeschwader 2 "Richthofen"
 232nd Oak Leaves on 16 April 1943 as Hauptmann and Gruppenkommandeur of the III./Jagdgeschwader 2 "Richthofen"
 51st Swords on 2 March 1944 as Oberstleutnant and Geschwaderkommodore of Jagdgeschwader 2 "Richthofen"

Notes

References

Citations

Bibliography

 
 
 
 
 
 
 
 
 
 
 
 
 
 
 
 
 
 
 
 
 
 
 
 
 
 
 
 
 
 
 

1917 births
1944 deaths
Luftwaffe pilots
People from Konstanz
Aviators killed by being shot down
German World War II flying aces
Luftwaffe personnel killed in World War II
Recipients of the Gold German Cross
Recipients of the Knight's Cross of the Iron Cross with Oak Leaves and Swords
People from the Grand Duchy of Baden
Burials at Saint-Désir-de-Lisieux German war cemetery
Military personnel from Baden-Württemberg